Motive power depot
Railway workshop
Track maintenance